Ballyboy may refer to several places in Ireland:

 Ballyboy, a village in County Offaly
 Ballyboy (barony), a barony in County Offaly
 Ballyboy, County Westmeath, a townland in Portloman civil parish, barony of Corkaree, County Westmeath
 Ballyboy also refers to several other townlands in the Republic of Ireland

See also
 Ballyboylands Lower, a townland in County Antrim, Northern Ireland
 Ballyboylands Upper, a townland in County Antrim, Northern Ireland